Binh Minh Plastic Joint Stock Company (Công ty Cổ phần Nhựa Bình Minh) is a Vietnamese plastics company. It is listed in the Ho Chi Minh City Stock Exchange since 2006.

It is one of southern Vietnam's leading plastics companies, with major competitors being Tan Tien, Rang Dong, Tan Phu, Van Don, Minh Hung and Cong Nghia.

History
Binh Minh Plastic was set up after a merger of Kepivi (Công ty ống nhựa hoá học Việt Nam) and Kieu Tinh Plastic (Công ty Nhựa Kiều Tinh công tư hợp doanh) in 1977. It was part of Vinaplast Group (Tổng Công ty Nhựa Việt Nam) from 1994 until 2003, when Vinaplast was dissolved and Binh Minh Plastic became a joint stock company.

Financial Information

Production
Binh Minh Plastic has a subsidiary in northern Vietnam with a capital stock of 100 bn VND (Công ty TNHH MTV Nhựa Bình Minh Miền Bắc), which operates a factory in Pho Noi A Industrial Park in Hưng Yên Province since 2007.

Construction on the companies fourth factory started in 2010 in Long An Province. It will be its largest and most modern. It is expected to start operation in 2013 and help increase output to 100,000 tonnes of products per year and revenue to 3 trillion dong.

References

Manufacturing companies established in 1977
Manufacturing companies based in Ho Chi Minh City
Plastics companies of Vietnam
Vietnamese brands
Vietnamese companies established in 1977